Jair Ayrton Córdova Carpio (born 18 August 1996) is a Peruvian professional footballer who plays as a forward for Alianza Universidad.

Club career

Cienciano
In 2016, Córdova played for Peruvian Liga 2 side Cienciano, making five appearances and scoring two goals.

Alianza Atlético
In 2017, Córdova signed for Peruvian Liga 1 side Alianza Atlético. That season, he made nineteen appearances and scored one goal as the club was relegated. The following season in Liga 2, Córdova made 27 appearances and scoring 23 goals, winning the league golden boot. He made one additional appearance in the league playoffs.

Carlos A. Mannucci
On 5 January 2019, Córdova signed with Liga 1 side Carlos A. Mannucci. After making one appearance, he left the club in early 2019.

Juan Aurich
On 21 May 2019, Córdova signed with Liga 2 side Juan Aurich. That season, he made sixteen league appearances, scoring nine goals and added another goal in two playoff appearances.

Alianza Universidad
On 19 December 2019, Córdova signed with Liga 1 side Alianza Universidad.

Cavalry FC
On 22 January 2020, Córdova signed with Canadian Premier League side Cavalry FC, after the Canadian club activated his release clause. Shortly after arriving in Canada, Córdova would be forced to enter quarantine due to the COVID-19 pandemic, and would miss further time due to an ankle sprain suffered before the start of the 2020 season. Following the 2020 season, Córdova and the club would mutually agree to part ways, as he would move back to Peru to be closer to family.

Return to Alianza Universidad
On 6 December 2020, Córdova re-signed with his previous club, Alianza Universidad.

Career statistics

Honours
Individual
Liga 2 Top Scorer: 2018

References

External links

1996 births
Living people
Association football forwards
Peruvian footballers
Footballers from Lima
Peruvian expatriate footballers
Expatriate soccer players in Canada
Peruvian expatriate sportspeople in Canada
Cienciano footballers
Alianza Atlético footballers
Carlos A. Mannucci players
Juan Aurich footballers
Alianza Universidad footballers
Cavalry FC players
Peruvian Segunda División players
Peruvian Primera División players
Canadian Premier League players